Sergei Kalinin or Sergey Kalinin may refer to:

Sergei Kalinin (sport shooter) (born 1926), Russian Olympic shooter
Sergei Kalinin (actor) (1896–1971), Russian actor in Resurrection
Sergei Kalinin (ice hockey) (born 1991), Russian ice hockey forward
Sergei V. Kalinin, director of the Institute for Functional Imaging of Materials